Nizhnekaryshevo (Tübänge Qarış) is a rural locality (a selo) in Nizhnekaryshevsky Selsoviet, Baltachevsky District, Bashkortostan, Russia. The population was 387 as of 2010. There are 13 streets.

Geography 
Nizhnekaryshevo is located 22 km south of Starobaltachevo (the district's administrative centre) by road. Verkhnekaryshevo is the nearest rural locality.

References 

Rural localities in Baltachevsky District